"Real to Me" is the debut single of Irish singer Brian McFadden, released in September 2004 from his debut solo album, Irish Son (2004). The song was written by McFadden, Guy Chambers and David Merritt and was produced by Chambers and Richard Flack. It was McFadden's first number-one single, peaking atop the charts of Denmark, Ireland, Norway, and the United Kingdom. In Finland and Sweden, it reached the top five, and following its release in Australia and New Zealand, it peaked at numbers 54 and 16, respectively.

Music video
The music video was directed by Nigel Dick. The video shows McFadden crossing paths with his past self who is seen arguing with his agent (Neil Burgess) before picking up a vase of flowers and throwing it at a wall and then notices McFadden watching, follows him to a large building and watches him and his band performing before leaving.

Track listings
All song were written by Brian McFadden. Additional writers are credited in parentheses.

UK and European CD1
 "Real to Me" (clean edit) (Guy Chambers) – 3:42
 "Uncomplicated" (Chambers) – 3:42

UK and European CD2
 "Real to Me" (album version) (Chambers)
 "Oblivious" (Paul Barry)
 "Walking Disaster" (Phil Thornalley)
 "Real to Me" (video)

Australian CD single
 "Real to Me" (album version) (Chambers) – 3:45
 "Oblivious" (Barry) – 3:15
 "Walking Disaster" (Thornalley) – 3:21

Charts

Weekly charts

Year-end charts

Release history

References

2004 debut singles
2004 songs
Brian McFadden songs
Epic Records singles
Irish Singles Chart number-one singles
Music videos directed by Nigel Dick
Number-one singles in Denmark
Number-one singles in Norway
Number-one singles in Scotland
Song recordings produced by Guy Chambers
Songs written by Brian McFadden
Songs written by Guy Chambers
Sony Music UK singles
UK Singles Chart number-one singles